Coherent states are quasi-classical states that may be defined in different ways, for instance as eigenstates of the annihilation operator

 ,

or as a displacement from the vacuum

 ,

where  is the Sudarshan-Glauber displacement operator.

One may think of a non-linear coherent state  by generalizing the
annihilation operator:

 ,

The above definition is also known as an -deformed annihilation operator.

References

Quantum mechanics